Rhabdopelix (meaning "rod pelvis") is a dubious genus of possible kuehneosaurid reptile, from the Late Triassic-age Lockatong Formation of Pennsylvania, USA.  Based on partial, possibly chimeric remains, it was described by American naturalist and paleontologist Edward Drinker Cope as an early pterosaur. It held this status until the 1960s, when Ned Colbert reevaluated it for his description of Icarosaurus.  He noted that the bones came from a block with the remains of other animals, and that Cope had misinterpreted some of the remains; for example, the rod-like "pubic bones" that had given it its name were actually much more like the bony structures used by Icarosaurus and related animals to glide. Additionally, he couldn't relocate the fossils, which are assumed to be lost.  He recommended considering Rhabdopelix a dubious name. Peter Wellnhofer retained it as a pterosaur of unknown affinities in his 1978 review, but rejected this by 1991.

The holotype is likely a chimera consisting of Tanytrachelos, Icarosaurus, and/or fish fossils.

See also

 List of pterosaur genera
 Timeline of pterosaur research

References

Prehistoric lepidosaurs
Nomina dubia
Triassic lepidosauromorphs
Late Triassic reptiles of North America
Taxa named by Edward Drinker Cope
Prehistoric reptile genera
Fossil taxa described in 1870